Qiu Qiaoping (born 31 October 1971) is a Chinese athlete. She competed in the women's discus throw at the 1992 Summer Olympics.

References

1971 births
Living people
Athletes (track and field) at the 1992 Summer Olympics
Chinese female discus throwers
Olympic athletes of China
Place of birth missing (living people)
Universiade silver medalists for China
Universiade medalists in athletics (track and field)
Medalists at the 1991 Summer Universiade
20th-century Chinese women